War of Internet Addiction is an anti-censorship machinima advocacy production on behalf of the mainland Chinese World of Warcraft community, aesthetically notable for being made entirely in in-universe style. A protest against internet censorship in China, it was first uploaded by video creator nicknamed "Sexy Corn" onto Tudou.com, within days of its release it was banned from a few PRC video sites such as Youku.com, but has since struck a chord with the wider public beyond the gaming community, eventually becoming more popular on-line than Avatar.

The 64-minute video expresses the frustrations of mainland Chinese WoW players being restricted to mainland servers and presents their grievances and normal feelings to the real world, inasmuch they are often marginalized as being Internet addicts dwelling inside virtual worlds. While the video was considered to be bold and rebellious by the Chinese government, it won the Best Video award in the 2010 Tudou Video Film awards.

Major themes and players

The video agit-prop vigorously satirizes the travails of mainland Chinese WoW players over the latter half of 2009 using the technique of personification; the game itself serves as both stage and a framing device. The numerous conflicts and issues addressed include:  electroshock therapy for purported internet addiction; the Chinese government's attempts to censor the internet with mandatory installations of the Green Dam Youth Escort filter; the corporate battle between the PRC's two primary game servers, The9 and Netease, over licensing renewal rights; and finally, the bureaucratic in-fighting between the governmental organs General Administration of Press and Publication and the Ministry of Culture over control of the game. Along the way the video also satirizes and/or parodies numerous Internet tropes, memes, in-jokes, running gags and clichés which are specific to, and endemic to, Chinese net culture as well as certain elements of American pop culture.  (Obvious take-offs on certain aspects of the Terminator franchise, for example, bookend the main action of the story, but at one point major characters engage in poetic battle by doing the dozens in Chinese couplets.) Furthermore, given its production of political satire by game engine, War of Internet Addiction counts, not only as an heir to the roman à clef tradition, but as an influential machinima à clef in its own right.

Oil Tiger Machinima Team
This is the third movie by Oil Tiger Machinima Team, released on 21 Jan 2010. Two days later it was banned on all major Chinese video sharing websites.

During an interview the producer Corndog (Chinese:性感玉米) stated that up to 100 people were involved in the production and that it took three months to make and cost zero dollars, as all the staff were volunteers.

Corndog elaborated that because the production team were all born in the 1980s, they all grew up playing computer games. They had specifically chosen on-line games as their medium for economic reasons, since outdoor activities involve higher costs. World of Warcraft's superior quality plus the emphasis on team co-operation all gave them a sense of belonging.

In another interview Corndog remarked that he had made the video for fellow WoW players and that he hadn't expected it to resonate with a wider audience.  That said, "The last part of the video moved many people, including those who do not play the game, since we actually live in the same society and we are facing the same Internet environment," he said in an emailed response to questions from a Phoenix TV reporter last month. The strong response "should make decision-makers ponder."

The entire video uses the graphics and characters of the on-line version of World of Warcraft (WoW) and includes audio (theme music from Terminator 2: Judgment Day and BonJovi's Bells of Freedom)
added by the game's fans from Taiwan and mainland China.

Allusions and references

Blue electric lighting
Near the beginning (and in some later scenes) there is blue lighting accompanied by low-pitched transformer humming sounds, a foreshadowing of the electro-shock therapy offered by Yang Yongxin, who ultimately proves to be the archvillain of the piece.

Room 13
In the video there is discussion about a torture chamber by the name of Room 13, where the suave and evil Uncle Yang would apply electric shock therapy to WoW players to cure them of their "Internet addiction".

Kannimei's speech
Near the end of the video rebel leader Kannimei, a blue-skinned minotaur, gives a long and impassioned speech (in effect breaking the fourth wall) about the hostile censorship environment facing WoW players, a speech which actually moved some gamers to tears.

Reception
China Daily placed the film on their list of the best ten Chinese films of 2010.

References

Footnotes

Sources 
Background info and list of references to Chinese pop culture and contemporary events
 凤凰卫视：《网瘾战争》说出了玩家的心声
 南方都市报报道《网瘾战争》 采访作者玉米
 2009国服总结视频：看你妹第三部之《网瘾战争》
 最震撼大片不是<阿凡达> 网友自制史诗<网瘾战争> www.people.com.cn
  80后来了，80后在这里 作者:  南方周末评论员 戴志勇   2010-02-03
 推荐一个令人致敬的视频：《看你妹--网瘾战争 凯迪社区 猫眼看人

External links
Background of the production
War of Internet Addiction Video:With English subtitle
War of Internet Addiction, translated segments on the China Digital Times
Web addiction shock therapy banned. Reported by Jane Chen  |   2009-7-15 
Net addicts need help from school and home
Chinese hospital gives internet addicts shock therapy
Cure your Children’s Internet Addiction with Electric Shocks Aversion Therapy 14 May 2009 
Shock therapy for Internet addiction halted. Posted by Eric Mu, 14 July
Part of the dialogue
 网瘾战争 War of Internet Addiction – Are World of Warcraft’s Travails In China Much More Interesting Than Google’s?24 January 2010

Internet censorship in China
World of Warcraft
Machinima works